White-collar crime is a form of financial crime.

White Collar Crime may refer to:
"White Collar Crime", song by Private Line (band)
"White Collar Crime", song by The Fauves from Thousand Yard Stare
"White Collar Crime", song by Grace Jones from Inside Story